The 2012 IRB Junior World Championship was the fifth annual international rugby union competition for Under 20 national teams. This competition replaced the now defunct Under 19 and Under 21 world championships. The event was organised in South Africa between 4 and 22 June 2012 by rugby's governing body, the IRB. A total of 12 nations played in the tournament. New Zealand came into the tournament as defending champions. South Africa were crowned 2012 champions after defeating New Zealand 22 - 16 in the final on the 22 June at Newlands Stadium.

After finishing last at the 2011 IRB Junior World Championship, Tonga had been relegated to the IRB Junior World Trophy and therefore didn't participate in this year's event. They had been replaced with Samoa, who won the 2011 IRB Junior World Rugby Trophy. Italy were relegated to the IRB Junior World Trophy for 2013 after losing the last place play-off to Fiji. They were replaced in 2013 with the United States, winner of the 2012 IRB Junior World Rugby Trophy.

Venues
The championship was held in Cape Town, South Africa. In an effort to improve TV broadcasting for all matches, only two venues were planned to be used. However, on 8 June 2012, organizers moved all the matches that were scheduled to be played at the Danie Craven Stadium in Stellenbosch to the Cape Town Stadium in Green Point and Newlands Stadium in Newlands due to heavy rain that damaged the pitches of the initial venue.

Squads

Teams

Pool stage
All times are in South African Standard Time (UTC+2).

Pool A

{| class="wikitable" style="text-align: center;"
|-
!width="200"|Team
!width="20"|Pld
!width="20"|W
!width="20"|D
!width="20"|L
!width="20"|TF
!width="20"|PF
!width="20"|PA
!width="25"|PD
!width="20"|BP
!width="20"|Pts
|-
|align=left| 
| 3 || 3 || 0 || 0 || 11 || 127 || 27 || +100 || 2 || 14
|-
|align=left| 
| 3 || 2 || 0 || 1 || 15 || 102 || 21 || +81 || 3 || 11
|-
|align=left| 
| 3 || 1 || 0 || 2 || 7 ||45 || 80 || -35 || 0 || 4
|-
|align=left| 
| 3 || 0 || 0 || 3 || 0 || 6 || 152 || -146 || 0 || 0
|}

Pool B

{| class="wikitable" style="text-align: center;"
|-
!width="200"|Team
!width="20"|Pld
!width="20"|W
!width="20"|D
!width="20"|L
!width="20"|TF
!width="20"|PF
!width="20"|PA
!width="28"|PD
!width="20"|BP
!width="20"|Pts
|-
|align=left| 
| 3 || 2 || 0 || 1 || 13 || 99 || 41 || +58 || 3 || 11
|-
|align=left| 
| 3 || 2 || 0 || 1 || 10 || 79 || 51 || +28 || 2 || 10
|-
|align=left| 
| 3 || 2 || 0 || 1 || 11 || 99 || 48 || +51 || 1 || 9
|-
|align=left| 
| 3 || 0 || 0 || 3 || 2 || 20 || 157 || -137 || 0 || 0
|}

Pool C

{| class="wikitable" style="text-align: center;"
|-
!width="200"|Team
!width="20"|Pld
!width="20"|W
!width="20"|D
!width="20"|L
!width="20"|TF
!width="20"|PF
!width="20"|PA
!width="25"|PD
!width="20"|BP
!width="20"|Pts
|-
|align=left| 
| 3 || 3 || 0 || 0 || 7 || 50 || 30 || +20 || 0 || 12
|-
|align=left| 
| 3 || 2 || 0 || 1 || 8 || 76 || 54 || +22 || 3 || 11
|-
|align=left| 
| 3 || 1 || 0 || 2 || 12 || 77 || 58 || +19 || 1 || 5
|-
|align=left| 
| 3 || 0 || 0 || 3 || 7 || 53 || 114 || -61 || 2 || 2
|}

Standings after the Group Stage

Knockout stage

9–12th place play-offs

Semifinals

11th place game

9th place game

5–8th place play-offs

Semifinals

7th place game

5th place game

Finals

Semifinals

Third place game

Final

References

External links

2012 IRB Junior World Championship at ESPN

2012
2012 rugby union tournaments for national teams
2012 in South African rugby union
International rugby union competitions hosted by South Africa
2012 in youth sport